Leonard Austin Williams (born June 20, 1994) is an American football defensive tackle for the New York Giants of the National Football League (NFL). He was drafted by the New York Jets with the sixth overall pick in the first round of the 2015 NFL Draft. He played college football at USC.

Early years
Williams attended Mainland High School in Daytona Beach, Florida, where he was a two-sport athlete in football and track. As a senior, he had 103 tackles and 10.5 sacks, helping Mainland to reach the FHSAA 6A state semi-finals, where they lost to Miami Central 7–17. However, the loss was overturned in August 2012 as Miami Central forfeited its entire season due to a transfer infraction.

Considered a four-star recruit by Rivals.com, Williams was ranked as the fifth best strongside defensive end recruit in his class.

College career

As a true freshman in 2012, Williams started nine of 13 games at defensive tackle, recording 64 tackles, eight sacks and an interception. He was named the Pac-12 Defensive Freshman of the Year. As a sophomore in 2013, Williams was moved from tackle to defensive end. After recording 74 tackles and six sacks, Williams was a named a first-team All-Pac-12 selection and was an All-American by ESPN. As a junior in 2014, he recorded 80 tackles and seven sacks. He was named Team MVP, first-team All-Pac-12 and was an All-American by the American Football Coaches Association (AFCA) and ESPN.

After his junior season, Williams announced that he would forgo his senior year and enter the 2015 NFL Draft.

Professional career

Pre-draft
In May 2014, Williams was projected a top-4 selection in the 2015 NFL Draft by various mock drafts. By October 2014, Williams was projected as a top-3 selection in the 2015 NFL Draft. In the months leading up to the draft Williams was regularly the 2nd pick in mock drafts, but in the final weeks most experts predicted that Marcus Mariota would instead be the 2nd pick, with Williams subsequently falling to 3-5th place.

New York Jets
Williams was selected by the New York Jets sixth overall in the first round of the 2015 draft. He was the highest selected USC defensive lineman since Darrell Russell in 1997. Williams signed a four-year, $18.6 million contract on May 8, 2015.

2015 season
Williams made his professional debut on August 11, 2015, in the first preseason game against the Detroit Lions without recording a stat. In his second preseason game against the Atlanta Falcons on August 21, 2015, Williams made 4 tackles, including a sack on T. J. Yates in the endzone for a safety. During his third preseason game against the interleague-rival New York Giants on August 29, 2015, Williams left the game with an apparent knee injury. X-Rays and MRIs were both negative, revealing no ligament damage. On September 7, 2015, he had his jersey number switched to #92 from #62. On his regular season debut against the Cleveland Browns on September 13, 2015, Williams made a total of 5 tackles. On the December 6, 2015, Williams recorded his first sack in a Giants-Jets rivalry game. In 16 games of his rookie year in 2015, Williams made 63 tackles with 3 sacks.

2016 season

Opening the season against the Cincinnati Bengals on September 11, 2016, Williams had 2.5 sacks for his first career multi-sack game. The Jets combined for 6 sacks, but still lost 23-22. He had a total of 7 sacks on the season, and as recognition for his great play, he was selected as a first-team alternate for the 2017 Pro Bowl.

2017 season
In 2017, Williams started all 16 games, recording a career-low 47 tackles and two sacks.

2018 season
On April 11, 2018, the Jets picked up the fifth-year option on Williams' contract.

During Week 16 against the Green Bay Packers, Williams was disqualified for the first time in his NFL career after throwing a punch on Bryan Bulaga. This was one of 16 penalties as the Jets lost the game 44-38 in overtime. On December 29, Williams was fined $43,449, which also included a hit on Aaron Rodgers.

New York Giants

2019 season

On October 28, 2019, Williams was traded to the New York Giants for a 2020 third round pick and a 2021 fifth round pick. In week 15 against the Miami Dolphins, Williams forced a fumble on former teammate Ryan Fitzpatrick which was recovered by teammate Sean Chandler during the 36–20 win.

2020 season
On March 16, 2020, the Giants placed the franchise tag on Williams. He signed the one-year tender on April 22, 2020. He was placed on the active/non-football injury list at the start of training camp on August 2, 2020. He was activated on August 14, 2020.

In Week 1 against the Pittsburgh Steelers on Monday Night Football, Williams recorded his first sack of the season on Ben Roethlisberger during the 26–16 loss.  Williams' sack was his first full sack as a member of the Giants and surpassed his 2019 total of 0.5 sacks. In Week 13 against the Seattle Seahawks, Williams recorded 2.5 sacks on Russell Wilson during the 17–12 win.  Williams was named the NFC Defensive Player of the Week for his performance in Week 13. In Week 17 against the Dallas Cowboys, Williams recorded three sacks on Andy Dalton during the 23–19 win. Williams won the NFC Defensive Player Of The Week Award again for his performance. This brought Williams’ total to 11.5 sacks on the season.

2021 season
The Giants placed the franchise tag on Williams for the second consecutive season on March 9, 2021. 

On March 18, 2021, the New York Giants signed Williams to a three-year, $63 million contract that includes $45 million guaranteed and a signing bonus of $22.50 million.

2022 season
On September 6, 2022, the Giants restructured Williams’ contract to create more cap space. He sprained his MCL in Week 2 against the Carolina Panthers.

References

External links

USC Trojans bio
New York Jets bio

1994 births
Living people
Sportspeople from Daytona Beach, Florida
Players of American football from Florida
American football defensive ends
American football defensive tackles
USC Trojans football players
New York Jets players
New York Giants players
American Conference Pro Bowl players